The Alpine Hotel dates from 1914 and was built as a home of a British tea planter. Later it was bought by the Dodampa Gamage family, who rented out the rooms to visitors. Now a hotel, it retains the old colonial charms and its architecture is one of the few lasting proofs of the bygone British Era.

The hotel has 30 rooms, a restaurant, billiards room, a bar and two lounges and a coffee shop.

In 2006 the Alpine Hotel won the 'Star Award' for the best performing anthropometry in the Central Province under the large scale service sector.

Location
The hotel is situated a kilometre away from Nuwara Eliya, facing the town hall and the Nuwara Eliya Racecourse, on the Main Road towards Badulla.

References

External links
 Official website

Hotels in Nuwara Eliya
Buildings and structures in Nuwara Eliya